Quinton is a small unincorporated community in New Kent County, Virginia, United States. It is located on State Route 249 in the western portion of the county.

Crump's Mill and Millpond and New Kent High School and George W. Watkins High School are listed on the National Register of Historic Places.

References

Unincorporated communities in Virginia
Unincorporated communities in New Kent County, Virginia